Osing may refer to:
the Osing people
the Osing dialect